Carboxyfluorescein diacetate succinimidyl ester (CFDA-SE) is an amine-reactive, cell-permeable dye generally used in animal cell proliferation research. CFDA-SE is a modified CFSE with two hydroxyl groups on its fluorescein moiety replaced with acetates. This change renders the molecule more hydrophobic and cell-permeable at the expense of its fluorescence property. After entering cells by diffusion, CFDA-SE is cleaved by intracellular esterase enzymes to form CFSE. As its reactive succinimidyl ester group is unmodified, CFDA-SE also covalently binds to lysine residues and other amine sources like CFSE.

If a stained cell divides, the dye is divided equally between the two daughter cells, resulting in both new cells having a CFDA-SE concentration approximately 50% that of the mother cell. A cell stained with CFDA-SE can be kept in culture for several days and fluorescence is detectable in cells following up to 8 successive cell divisions. Fluorescence is typically detected using a flow cytometer on the FL1 detector, with each resulting fluorescent peak representing another round of cell division. The area of each peak is representative of the number of cells in a given division cycle. The staining works best with relatively homogeneous cell populations.

High concentrations of the dye are toxic to animal cells; however, concentrations in the region of 10 micromolar are typically sufficient to give strong staining with minimal cell death. Most cell types will excrete a proportion of the dye over the course of the first 24–48 hours following staining. Dye levels should thereafter remain relatively stable in non-dividing cells. 

CFDA-SE is often erroneously referred to as CFSE, even in scientific literature.

See also
 Carboxyfluorescein
 Carboxyfluorescein succinimidyl ester

References

Fluorone dyes
Vital stains
Acetate esters
Succinimides